The 2012 Asian Judo Championships were the 19th edition of the Asian Judo Championships, and were held in Tashkent, Uzbekistan from April 27 to April 29, 2012.

Medal summary

Men

Women

Medal table

Participating nations 
185 athletes from 26 nations competed.

 (7)
 (14)
 (11)
 (2)
 (4)
 (1)
 (10)
 (14)
 (14)
 (14)
 (5)
 (14)
 (2)
 (4)
 (3)
 (3)
 (4)
 (3)
 (14)
 (3)
 (7)
 (11)
 (1)
 (14)
 (4)
 (2)

References

 Team Results
 Results

External links
 

Asian Championships
Asian Judo Championships
Asian Judo Championships
International sports competitions hosted by Uzbekistan
Sport in Tashkent
21st century in Tashkent
Asian